United States v. Robel, 389 U.S. 258 (1967), was a case heard by the Supreme Court of the United States. The court ruled that the United States government cannot deprive the people of constitutional rights - in this case, freedom of association - even in the interests of national security.

The petitioner, Eugene Frank Robel, who worked at Todd Shipyards in Seattle, was indicted on May 21, 1963, for being a member of the Communist Party of the United States (CPUSA) and thus affiliated with it, without being registered with the Subversive Activities Control Board in violation of the McCarran Internal Security Act section 5 (a) (I) (D). Since the act required CPUSA to register as a Communist Party, he was told because of his affiliation with the Party, he also had to register as well, and that he could no longer work at the shipyard because of his affiliation with the Communist Party; Todd Shipyards had been designated a "defense" facility, otherwise known as federal employment, which was illegal under the McCarran Act. Robel appealed his conviction to the Supreme Court.

The Court found the McCarran Internal Security Act violates the defendant's right to free association that is guaranteed by the First Amendment.

See also
 List of United States Supreme Court cases, volume 389

External links
 

United States Supreme Court cases
United States Supreme Court cases of the Warren Court
United States freedom of association case law
1967 in United States case law